Marchin is a municipality of Wallonia located in the province of Liège, Belgium. 

On January 1, 2006, Marchin had a total population of 5,114. The total area is 30.00 km² which gives a population density of 170 inhabitants per km².

The municipality consists of the following districts: Marchin, and Vyle-et-Tharoul.

See also
 List of protected heritage sites in Marchin

References

External links
 

Municipalities of Liège Province